Dakari (born Dakarai Gwitira) also known as D.G., is a Zimbabwe-born music producer, audio engineer, and DJ. As of 2019, Dakari has already earned a number of hit records as a producer, writer, and engineer; most notably for G-Eazy.

Early life 

Dakari immigrated to the U.S., specifically Dallas, Texas, at age 12. Creating noise in every which way possible, absorbing as much as he could, Dakari took that passion and turned it into a career.  Before becoming a world-class music-maker, Dakari grew up in Zimbabwe.  “I was in to music but I never knew of it as a career path. My dad at the time lived here in the U.S. so he sent back a keyboard and I used to play on it. I couldn’t record on it because it wasn’t a sequence so I’d play a drum pattern and memorize it and be playing a beat in my head while I play a melody. I would pick it up and play with it for a month then I’d forget about it for a few months. Then I’d randomly come back to it and that’s how it always was. That was music for me back then.  Most Zimbabwean radio jams were sung in English, Dakari never understood the lyrics.  It wasn't until he learned English later, that Dakari was be able to really take his overall musical understanding to the next level and earn the career success and recognition to match.

As he settled into heart of America's south during his formative teenaged years, Dakari became obsessed with the back catalogues of Pharrell Williams, Outkast, Missy Elliott, and the type of futurist hip-hop that remains just as innovative today as it did in the early 2000s. To Dakari, those names all championed their own 'sound'. To a kid raised in Zimbabwe now living in Texas, making a life and career as a musician was an alien concept reserved for well connected industry types living on the East or West coast.

"I never thought of music as 'work' or something that people could make a living from."  It wasn't until he witnessed Timbaland building hits on MTV's Making the Band that he really began to wrap his head around the possibility of making a career in music, pushing him towards a move to New York City.  Ironically, his Making The Band-inspired drive proved prophetic.

Early career 
Dakari's career would not be where it is today had he not made initial strides to go beyond his passions for Hip hop and R&B. Leaving Texas and moving to New York offered Dakari opportunities to expand. "I had a very specific idea of what 'dope' was, and I had a lot of judgement toward music but New York taught me to let go of all that," he says now, looking back. A Brazilian roommate introduced him to the Latin-tinged rhythms of South America and he found everyday influence in the bodegas and back alleys hidden amidst the concrete jungle. Before names like hit the upper pop echelons, Dakari had established his working relationship with them. Spending more and more time at the legendary Quad Studios, Dakari became head engineer, working with a plethora of superstar and soon-to-be-superstars ranging including names like DJ Khaled, Akon, Meek Mill, Nelly, Ne-Yo, Sara Bareilles, Meghan Trainor and Ashanti.   "The city really shaped who I am today, not only musically, but as a person."

Career  (2015–present) 
In 2015, Dakari picked up his bags for the last time and moved to Los Angeles to work closely with G-Eazy, and three years later he has never looked back.  "Within the first 10 seconds [of meeting G-Eazy and hearing him rap], I knew I was going to work with this guy."

Dakari later applied his skills as an engineer for G-Eazy's 2015 album When It's Dark Out – and mixed the 10-time platinum single, "Me, Myself & I (w/ Bebe Rexha)". From there, Dakari continued as G-Eazy's engineer, only with added production responsibilities.  With G-Eazy's 2017 album The Beautiful & Damned, Dakari continued on the boards both as an engineer, and now as a producer as well.  Dakari produced many of the album's songs, including the title song with Zoe Nash and "Sober" with Charlie Puth.

Dakari is no longer just behind the boards. "I'm doing a DJ/Producer project. I just wanna release my version of dope and connect with the people that connect with what I like. That's what being an artist is, really, that enough people like your music. What I've kind of realized is just that sometimes other people's version of dope and my [version of dope] just doesn't match. I'm not trying to be old and have a bunch of music I thought was dope and it never existed because I never placed it with an artist or because it didn't click with somebody in the business."  In November 2018, he released his debut single "Enough (ft. G-Eazy, Tommy Genesis & Jo'zzy)"

Discography

External links 

D.G. - Quad Studios
Dakari - Genius
The Beautiful & Damned - (Spotify)
G-Eazy - "Sober (ft. Charlie Puth)" - Official Music Video

References 

Living people
1989 births
Zimbabwean hip hop musicians